The Sony Vaio UX Micro PC is an  Ultra-Mobile Portable Computer (UMPC) first marketed in 2006. It weighs around 490–544 g (1.20–1.27 lb), and has a slide-out QWERTY keyboard, touchscreen, Intel Core 2 Solo processor, Bluetooth, Wi-Fi, and WWAN. Though not officially stated as such, and even to a point implied by Sony that the UX is a move in a new direction and not a specific continuation of such, the Sony UX is speculated by some to be the newest model in the popular Sony U-series. 

NOTE : Japanese models include 533 MHz memory and so do the minority markets ( Europe, Australia etc. ) models. The US ones do not have 533 MHz but slower 400 MHz.

All models share these features:
 4.5" XBrite TFT LCD touchscreen with 1024x600 display resolution.
 Intel Graphics Media Accelerator 950 Graphics Card (128 MB (128 MB) Shared RAM) - some have 256 MB
 Memory Stick Duo Slot
 Built-in Wi-Fi 802.11b/g and Bluetooth
 Fingerprint reader
 Front and back digital cameras

References in popular culture
 A black Vaio UX was used by John Connor in Terminator Salvation. It was used to hack mototerminator, track the cell Kyle Reese was being held captive in at Skynet.
 A Vaio UX is featured in the music video for the song "Sweetest Girl (Dollar Bill)" by Wyclef Jean. The UX delivers the message to Wyclef Jean that he must rescue the "sweetest girl" from deportation to a hostile country.
 Rodney McKay can be seen using one in several episodes of Stargate Atlantis, he's also used OQO UMPCs.
 Bill Tanner can be seen using a Sony Vaio UX in the 2008 motion picture Quantum of Solace.
 "Same Girl" by R. Kelly featuring Usher: R. Kelly looks at Usher's slideshow of the a lady on what appears to be the Sony VGN-UX 390.
 A Vaio UX is used as suitcase nuke arming device in one episode (hour) of the television show 24.
 A Sony Vaio UX is used by the antagonist in Paul Blart: Mall Cop.
 Riley Poole used a Vaio UX in National Treasure while capturing the security camera stream of the declaration of independence and to infiltrate Buckingham Palace in National Treasure 2.
 In The Pink Panther 2, Kenji uses a Sony Vaio UX when the Dream Team is investigating the crime scene of the stolen Pink Panther diamond.
 In the James Bond movie Casino Royale The Micro PC was used by Bill Tanner in the movie, and shown on the boat near the end of the film.  There was a promotional "Spy Gear" set created for the movie.

References

External links

 Micro PC Talk
 Sony UX280P - Review at Skatter Tech
 Sony Vaio UX series Sony Vaio UX series: At a glance from pocketables.net
 Sony Singapore Sony VAIO UX product listing

Ux
Ultra Mobile PC